"Desperate Man" is a song recorded by American country music singer Eric Church. Written by Church and Ray Wylie Hubbard, the song is the title track and lead single from his sixth studio album of the same name.

Content
Church announced the single and album via a livestream with his fan club, the Church Choir, in July 2018.

The song has been compared to "Sympathy for the Devil" by The Rolling Stones. Church said that he chose to write with Ray Wylie Hubbard after name-dropping him in his 2015 single "Mr. Misunderstood". This led to the two performing together in concert, and Church collaborating on a song of Hubbard's. Church presented the opening line, about a fortune teller who tells a man that he "has no future", from which Hubbard developed more lyrics and the song's groove. Hubbard told Taste of Country that the song is about being "completely at a point where you're willing to try anything." Church also noted that much of the song's emotion, along with its message of showing hope even when one is feeling troubled, were inspired by the 2017 Las Vegas shooting.

In the music video, which also features Hubbard in a cameo, Church gets "busted" by FBI agents whose uniforms read EMI, the name of his record label.

Commercial performance
The song peaked at No 8 on Hot Country Songs for chart dated October 18, 2018.
The song has sold 109,000 copies in the United States as of December 2018. It was certified Gold in Canada and Platinum in the US.

Charts

Weekly charts

Year-end charts

Certifications

References

2018 singles
2018 songs
EMI Records singles
Eric Church songs
Songs written by Eric Church
Song recordings produced by Jay Joyce